Gerald John Melling (1943 – 22 December 2012) was an English-born, architect, poet, novelist, journalist, author and editor.

Early life and education
Gerald John Melling discovered an interest in art and poetry from a young age before choosing architecture as a creative outlet and a way to make a living.  He left school at 16 to work in an architect's office as a cadet.  He attended night classes at Liverpool Technical Institute. In 1976 Melling received formal architectural training at Auckland University and gained his architectural registration in 1977.

Work

He worked briefly New York City and Toronto as a magazine editor before emigrating to New Zealand in 1971 to work for the Ministry of Works in Porirua.

From 1977 Gerald Melling was employed at the Board Of Education where he worked on various school projects, including Worser Bay School and Thorndon Kindergarten. This period sparked his interest in education theory and environments for learning and culminated in the publishing of his book Open Schoolhouse in 1981.

Gerald was briefly the editor of the «New Zealand Architect» magazine while at the Education Board. He wrote the first books about living New Zealand architects; Ian Athfield, "Joyful Architecture: The Genius of New Zealand's Ian Athfield" and later Roger Walker "Positively Architecture: New Zealand's Roger Walker", helping to bring New Zealand architecture to a worldwide audience.

In 1990 he formed Melling Morse Architects along with Allan Morse, and the pair worked on public and private buildings including the redevelopment of Left Bank Arcade, Auckland’s Butterfly Creek and Melling's own home The Skybox, which sits a top of the Melling Morse Architects office in Egmont St.

He experimented which various techniques to provide this including efficient planning, incorporation of recycled materials, "low tech" timber construction systems and reduction in scale.  A typical Melling house employed vernacular construction techniques (and occasionally vernacular forms) combined with the double living height spaces, mezzanines, open plan layouts and modular gridded organisation more usually associated with high modernist architecture.

In 2008 their company won the Home New Zealand Home of the Year award for a small Wairarapa home, called the Signal Box.

Following the Boxing Day Tsunami in 2004, he designed almost 50 houses and a community centre along the south coast of Sri Lanka, eventually writing a book called Tsunami Box about his experiences.

Personal
Melling is noted for his unique brand of Liverpudlian humour and Beatles'-style anti-establishmentarianism, which be often brought into his work. Following the Boxing Day Tsunami in 2004, he designed almost 50 houses and a community centre along the south coast of Sri Lanka, eventually writing a book called Tsunami Box (2010) about his experiences. He had two children, a daughter, Zoe Melling, and a son, David Melling, who is also an architect. He died on 22 December 2012 surrounded by his family.

Selected articles

"Thorndon Clinic", in Wellington's New Buildings, David Kernohan Victoria University Press, 1989

"The Music Box", in World Architecture
A Critical Mosaic 1900 -2000 Vol.10 Southeast Asia and Oceania Springer Weinn, New York City, 1999

"The Samurai House" and "Skybox", in at Home: A Century Of New Zealand Design,
Douglas Lloyd Jenkins Godwit/Random House, 2004

"The Music Box" and "Skybox", in Exquisite Apart, ed. Charles Walker
100 Years of Architecture in New Zealand NZIA, Auckland, 2004

"The Samurai House", in Architecture Inspired by New Zealand Mint Publishing, Auckland, 2006

"Skybox", in Home: New Directions in World Architecture and Design, Millennium House, NSW, Australia, 2006

Also numerous magazines, including Architectural Review, AIA Journal, Hauser, Architecture and Design India, New Zealand Architect, Architecture New Zealand, Home & Entertaining

Published written work

 Tsunami box, Press Free range, 2010
 An Artful Lodger NZIA 2005 Lecture Series – architecture poems.Thumbprint Press Broadsheet, 2005
 Open Home(co-authored with Dave Cull, Stuart Niven, & George Chimirri)Random House, Auckland, 1994
 Mid City Crisis & Other Stories Thumbprint Press, Wellington, 1989
 Positively Architecture: New Zealand’s Roger Walker Square One Press, Dunedin, 1985
 Open Schoolhouse: Environments for children in New Zealand Caveman Press, Dunedin, 1981
 Joyful Architecture: The genius of New Zealand’s Ian Athfield Caveman Press, Dunedin, 1980

Poetry by Gerald John Melling
Cursory Rhymes, June 2013 Published by Thumbprint Victoria University Press in association with Sport

Gerald began to write the poems collected in this book when he was diagnosed with nasty cancer in late October 2012 with was later combined into a book and introduced by Geoff Cochrane who is a poet and fiction writer and a dear friend of Gerald.

b.1943, Bumper Books, 1999 Postcards from the Coast, Thumbprint Press, 1992 Illustrated Poetry, Satyrday Publications,1968

His poems appeared in Landfall, Islands, Sport, Takahe, the Listener and elsewhere.

Awards and mentions

Signal box, HOME New Zealand, Home of the Year 2008
3 News, 7 August 2008 Houses New Zealand, Issue 6, Gerald Melling
The Gravy, Episode 13, May 2009

Samurai house TVNZ Home Front Feature
Phaidon Atlas of 21st Century Architecture

Music box, NZ Timber Design Journal, Issue 3/Vol. 6, 1997
Wellington City Council Case Study

Split box, Modern Residential Design, 2008
Phaidon Atlas of 21st Century Architecture

Other publications

Several anthologies of New Zealand poetry, and numerous literary journals and magazines, including Canadian Forum, New American / Canadian Poetry, Open City, Islands, Landfall, NZ Listener, Sport, Cave, NZ Poetry.

References

New Zealand architects
Architects from Liverpool
English emigrants to New Zealand
1943 births
2012 deaths